Barbara de Loor (born 26 May 1974) is a Dutch retired speed skater who was specialised in the middle long and longer distances, over 1000 to 5000 meters.

De Loor will be known in history as a talented skater who often ended up just after the awarded medal positions, which already started in her junior years when she became 6th and 4th at the World Junior Championships in 1992 and 1993 respectively. A few years later after she made the step to the seniors she qualified for the All-around World Championships and finished there in 9th position. That same year she reached two top-10 rankings at the World Single Distance Championships, while participating in three distances (8th over 3000 and 5000 meters, as well as 11th over 1500 meters). This was however also the year that she achieved her first international medal, by becoming third at the European All-around Championships, claiming the bronze.

In 1998 she finished sixth at the same European All-around Championship, she also qualified for her first Olympics, the 1998 Winter Olympics in Nagano, where she participated at the 1500 and 5000 meters. Her 22nd place at the 1500 meters was no success, however she surprised the world with her fourth position at the 5000 meters, finishing just outside the medals. The trend was set and in 1999 she became fourth over 3000 meters and fifth over 5000 meters at the World Single Distance Championships. She also finished fifth at the European All-around Championships and sixth at the World All-around Championships. In 2000, she would not come close to any of these efforts, but she returned at the highest level in 2001, reaching a fourth position at the European, and a fifth at the World All-around Championships. However the season was still disappointed as she failed to qualify for the 2002 Winter Olympics in Salt Lake City.

De Loor qualified herself for the 2003 World Single Distance Championships on two distances. She became 8th over 5000 meters and 4th over 1500 meters, missing just out on a medal yet again. A year later at the same distance and the same championship she again became 4th, while she was 5th at the European All-around Championships. In 2005, she would become 4th at the 1500 during the World Single Distance Championships for the third consecutive time. It was however the year of her biggest achievement in her career as she became the World Champion over 1000 meters in the same event, finishing in front of Anni Friesinger and Marianne Timmer to claim the gold.

In December 2005 she missed out on direct qualifying for the 2006 Winter Olympics, finishing behind some other contenders at the 1500 and 1000 meters. For the last distance she was however nominated by the Dutch Speed Skating Association due to her world title that year. She was awarded a skate-off with Paulien van Deutekom who finished 4th at the Dutch Single Distance Championship, where the qualifications were held. De Loor won the confrontation and was qualified for her second Olympics. In Turin at the Olympics she came close to a medal yet again, but this time she became 6th. After the Olympics she appeared at the Speed Skating World Cup meeting in Heerenveen where she became fifth over 1500 meters. It was the last race of her career.

In 2006 De Loor participated alongside professional dancer Marcus van Teijlingen in the Dutch version of Dancing with the Stars and won the competition. After that she appeared on several other television programs such as De Afvallers and De Afvallers met Sterren, as well as with a program named Nederlanders in Ontwikkeling.

Personal records
 500 meters, 39.79, 15 January 2005 in Calgary
 1000 meters, 1:16.03, 10 March 2001 in Salt Lake City
 1500 meters, 1:55.83, 11 March 2001 in Salt Lake City
 3000 meters, 4:04.56, 9 March 2001 in Salt Lake City
 5000 meters, 7:07.49, 10 January 1999 in Heerenveen

External links
Barbera de Loor at SpeedSkatingStats.com
 Barbera de Loor at SchaatsStatistieken.nl

1974 births
Dutch female speed skaters
Speed skaters at the 1998 Winter Olympics
Speed skaters at the 2006 Winter Olympics
Olympic speed skaters of the Netherlands
Dancing with the Stars winners
Sportspeople from Amsterdam
Living people
World Single Distances Speed Skating Championships medalists
21st-century Dutch women
20th-century Dutch women